Aldrovandini is an Italian surname. Notable people with the surname include:

Giuseppe Aldrovandini (1671–1707), Italian Baroque composer
Mauro Aldrovandini (1649–1680), Italian painter of the Baroque period
Pompeo Aldrovandini (1677–1735), Italian painter of the Baroque period, son of Mauro
Tommaso Aldrovandini (1677–1735), Italian painter of the Baroque period, nephew of Mauro

Italian-language surnames